Malacothamnus hallii is a species of flowering plant in the mallow family known by the common name Hall's bushmallow. It is endemic to southeastern counties of the San Francisco Bay Area, where it is a rare species. It has a California Rare Plant Rank of 1B.2 (Plants rare, threatened, or endangered in California and elsewhere). Malacothamnus hallii is occasionally treated within Malacothamnus fasciculatus.

References

External links
Calflora Profile: Malacothamnus hallii
'' Photo gallery at Calphotos

Flora of California
Endemic flora of California
hallii
Natural history of Contra Costa County, California
Natural history of Santa Clara County, California